Xiong Yan may refer to:

Xiong Yan (elder) (died 848 BC), monarch of the state of Chu
Xiong Yan (younger) (died 828 BC), his son, monarch of the state of Chu
Xiong Yan (dissident) (born 1964), Chinese dissident